Sinoceras is an extinct genus of nautiloids from China included in the family Orthoceratidae that lived from the middle Ordovician until the Devonian. The type species, S. chinense, was originally described as "Orthoceras chinense," but then was promoted by Shimizu and Obata to its own genus, Sinoceras, in 1935.

The shell of Sinoceras is like Michelinoceras in that it has a slender orthoconic shell but the camerae are shorter and septal necks proportionally longer, reaching nearly a third the camera length.  The surface in some is marked either by very fine irregular striae or by sinuous transverse growth bands. Doubtfully distinct from Michelinoceras.

References
 Sweet, Walter C. 1964. Nautiloidea-Orthocerida. Treatise on Invertebrate Paleontology, Part K. Geological Soc of America, and Univ Kansas Press.
 Sepkoski, J.J. Jr. 2002. A compendium of fossil marine animal genera. D.J. Jablonski & M.L. Foote (eds.). Bulletins of American Paleontology 363: 1–560.

 see List of nautiloids

Ordovician cephalopods of Asia
Prehistoric nautiloid genera
Middle Ordovician first appearances
Devonian extinctions